Darreh Bad (also Romanized as Darreh Bād) is a village in Abarj Rural District, Dorudzan District, Marvdasht County, Fars Province, Iran. At the 2006 census, its population was 1,411, in 306 families.

References 

Populated places in Marvdasht County